Interstate 172 (I-172) is a spur route from I-72 entirely within the US state of Illinois. At U.S. Route 24 (US 24), I-172 becomes Illinois Route 336 (IL 336), which runs north and east to Macomb via Carthage. The entire portion of I-172 and I-72 from I-172 east to Springfield is also known by its former name, the Central Illinois Expressway.

Route description
I-172 enters the Quincy area at exit 10 (IL 96), passing to the far east of the city. I-172 ends just northeast of Quincy, ending at US 24, continuing north as IL 110/IL 336 (Chicago–Kansas City Expressway).

History
I-172 originally was what I-72 is now from Springfield to the current interchange with I-172. This was approved by the American Association of State Highway and Transportation Officials (AASHTO) on June 9, 1991.

On April 23, 1995, after a reexamination by the Federal Highway Administration (FHWA), the highway to Hannibal was redesignated I-72, with the highway north to Quincy redesignated as I-172. The highway is non-chargeable, meaning that, even though it is an Interstate (designed and constructed to Interstate Highway standards and specifications), it was not built with federal funds.

Exit list

See also

References

External links

72-1
72-1
1
Transportation in Pike County, Illinois
Transportation in Adams County, Illinois